Ebadollah S. Mahmoodian (born 18 May 1943 in Zanjan, Iran) is a retired professor of mathematics at the Mathematical Sciences Department of Sharif University of Technology.

He received his Bachelor of Science in 1965 at University of Tehran and his master's degree in 1968 at Shiraz University. He got a Master's and a PhD degree from the University of Pennsylvania in 1971 and 1975, respectively. His thesis advisor were Albert Nijenhuis and Herbert Wilf. He was a professor of mathematics at the Mathematical Sciences Department of Sharif University of Technology since 1983. He co-edited Combinatorics Advances.

Mahmoodian has contributions in graph theory, in particular graph colouring. He has also worked on combinatorial designs, in particular, defining sets, and the relations between all those areas. Mahmoodian is also known for mentoring and research collaborations with Maryam Mirzakhani during her studies at Sharif University.

References

Further reading

External links 
 Publications on Google scholar

20th-century Iranian mathematicians
Graph theorists
Academic staff of Sharif University of Technology
People from Zanjan, Iran
1943 births
Living people
Iranian Science and Culture Hall of Fame recipients in Mathematics and Physics